Gretna is a rural locality in the local government areas (LGA) of Central Highlands and Derwent Valley in the Central and South-east LGA regions of Tasmania. The 2016 census has a population of 211 for the state suburb of Gretna.
It was formerly known as Stony Hut Plains, though the Gretna post office was known as Macquarie Plains for many years. It has a postcode of 7140.

History 
Gretna was gazetted as a locality in 1959.

Macquarie Plains Post Office opened in 1932 and was renamed Gretna in 1907.

Geography
The River Derwent forms the south-western and part of the southern boundaries of the locality. The A10 route (Lyell Highway) passes through from south to north-west, and two minor numbered routes branch from it. The C181 route (Marked Tree Road) runs north through the locality to meet the B110 route (Hollow Tree Road) in the locality of Hollow Tree, and the C183 route (Bluff Road) runs north-east to Elderslie.

Landmarks
Gretna is the location of three heritage listed locations, all of which were listed on the Register of the National Estate before its removal and along with 5 other properties are on the Tasmanian Heritage Register to this day.

 St Mary the Virgin Anglican Church, the local church built in 1848.
 Glenelg House, designed by Henry Hunter and finished in 1878, built for the Downie family.
 Clarendon  House, built by William Borrodaile Wilson in 1821.

References

Towns in Tasmania
Central Highlands (Tasmania)
Localities of Central Highlands Council
Localities of Derwent Valley Council